Anika Strnad (born 11 June 1998) is a Slovenian handball player for RK Žalec and the Slovenian national team.

She represented Slovenia at the 2019 World Women's Handball Championship.

References

1998 births
Living people
Slovenian female handball players